Royal Wallonia Walhain Chaumont-Gistoux is a Belgian association football club located in the municipality of Walhain, Walloon Brabant. They have played in the third division since 1997–98. However, in 2006–07, the club could not avoid relegation to the 4th level of Belgian football, i.e. the Promotion.

The club was founded in 1941, and currently plays at Stade du Boscailles.

External links 
 Royal Wallonia Walhain Official website

Association football clubs established in 1941
Football clubs in Belgium
1941 establishments in Belgium
R. Wallonia Walhain Chaumont-Gistoux
R. Wallonia Walhain Chaumont-Gistoux